Chill Manor is an educational first-person shooter for MS-DOS compatible systems. The game is designed to teach history to children. It is the sequel to I.M. Meen and shares similar gameplay. Chloe Leamon provided Ophelia Chill's voice, while Peter Berkrot reprised his role as I.M Meen.

Plot
The evil magician I.M. Meen's presumed wife Ophelia Chill obtains the Book of Ages and tears out all the pages within, allowing her to re-write history as she sees fit. It is up to one of four playable children to travel through her manor and correct history.

Gameplay
The player goes through 20 levels, fixing history mistakes in various scrolls.

Reception
In a retrospective review, AllGame gave Chill Manor score of 3.5 out of 5.

References

External links

1996 video games
Children's educational video games
DOS games
DOS-only games
First-person shooters
Video games featuring protagonists of selectable gender
Video games with 2.5D graphics
English-language-only video games
North America-exclusive video games
Video games developed in the United States
Sprite-based first-person shooters
Simon & Schuster Interactive games
Single-player video games